Picander's cycle of 1728–29 is a cycle of church cantata librettos covering the liturgical year. Johann Sebastian Bach set several of these librettos to music, but it is unknown whether he covered a substantial part of the cycle. This elusive cycle of cantata settings is indicated as the composer's fourth Leipzig cycle, or the Picander cycle.

Picander's librettos
A few questions regarding the collaboration between Bach and Picander regularly return in the scholarly literature on the subject. A first question is when they started to collaborate actively: that may have been as early as 1723 or as late as 1729. Another one is how many Picander texts were set by Bach: apparently as good as nothing from Picander's 1724–25 cycle, and from all other settings, including the St Matthew Passion, no more than around a dozen settings are extant. Finally: how did Bach and Picander get along? Picander was primarily a satirist producing lighthearted poetry, how come that his spiritual poetry, deemed without particular intrinsic qualities, led, when set by Bach, to sacred masterpieces? The collaboration seems unlikely: the serious Bach and the jocular librettist.

According to Bach's biographer Spitta, the composer chose Picander among other poets producing sacred poetry, such as Erdmann Neumeister and Salomon Franck, because Picander had few talents apart from having a swift pen and some affinity with music, that is, he could develop almost anything into lyrics, and so was amenable to producing texts tailored to the composer's expectations. A supposedly cordial relationship between the poet and the composer is illustrated by the fact that Picander's wife became a sponsor to Bach's daughter Johanna Carolina, born in 1737.

Besides, Bach may have been grave in religious matters, he had a humorous side too, for instance illustrated by the quodlibets on popular tunes he produced early in his career (BWV 524) as well as later on (BWV 988/31, 1741). When producing secular cantatas such as Hercules auf dem Scheidewege (1731), the Coffee Cantata, and the 1742 Peasant Cantata, the composer and satirist seem to have been likeminded.

Before June 1728
As a student in Leipzig, Picander started to publish satirical poetry in 1722. The earliest evidence of Bach setting part of a text by Picander appears to date from September 1723, for the cantata Bringet dem Herrn Ehre seines Namens, BWV 148, although dating of the cantata is uncertain.

From Advent 1724 Picander started publishing spiritual poetry for the occasions of the liturgical year in weekly installments, some of it however rather secular in content, with a satirical undertone or indulging in self-pity. He continued such publications until the last Sunday after Trinity the next year, at which point he bundled this year cycle of poetry in Sammlung Erbaulicher Gedanken (collection of elevating thoughts), which included lyrics for 68 chorale melodies, and the libretto for a Passion oratorio known as Erbauliche Gedanken auf den Grünen Donnerstag und Charfreitag über den Leidenden Jesum (BWV Anh. 169, not set by Bach). The collection also contained a substantially different version of the libretto of BWV 148.

For the church year 1724–25 Bach was presenting the second half of his second Leipzig cantata cycle and the first half of his third cantata cycle, apparently using none of the Erbauliche Gedanken poetry, nor for his cantatas, nor for his St John Passion, the second version of which he had composed for Good Friday 1725.

One of Picander's secular cantata librettos, Entfliehet, verschwindet, entweichet, ihr Sorgen, however appears to have been set by Bach for presentation in Weißenfels on 23 February 1725 (BWV 249a, a.k.a. Shepherds' Cantata). The lost music of this cantata was linked to the earliest version of Bach's Easter Oratorio, and Picander may have provided the parody text for this music for Easter first performed in 1725. The libretto for that Easter cantata is however unrelated to the poetry for the occasion of Easter published in Picander's 1724–25 cycle.

In August 1725 Bach set another of Picander's secular librettos, Zerreißet, zersprenget, zertrümmert die Gruft, BWV 205, a.k.a. Der zufriedengestellte Aeolus. Later that month Bach set the council election cantata Wünschet Jerusalem Glück, BWV Anh. 4, to a libretto by Picander, but the music of that cantata is lost. Another Picander libretto for a secular cantata is known to have been set by Bach and performed in Kothen, Steigt freudig in die Luft, BWV 36a. This was probably performed in 1726, but the libretto also exists in an earlier version, Schwingt freudig euch empor, BMV 36c, presumably also by Picander.

In 1726 Bach set further librettos by Picander: a secular cantata, Verjaget, zerstreuet, zerrüttet, ihr Sterne, BWV 249b and a church cantata for Michaelmas, Es erhub sich ein Streit, BWV 19. For that sacred work Picander had published a libretto in 1725, but the text used by Bach for his 1726 cantata is an extensively reworked version of the 1725 print. Early 1727 the composer and the librettist appear to have collaborated on further cantatas, and possibly the St Matthew Passion. Later in 1727, and in early 1728, there are two further secular cantatas composed by Bach on a Picander libretto.

First publication of the 1728–29 cycle
In June 1728 Picander produced the first installment of his 1728–29 cycle of cantata librettos. In its introduction he invited Bach to set the texts. No response of Bach has been recorded to this first set of 16 cantatas. If he set any of the librettos, the music has been completely lost.

Contrary to his 1724–25 cycle the installments were now in quarterly submissions of 16 to 19 cantata librettos each. These also include cantata text not usable in a Leipzig context (cantatas for the periods of Advent and Lent when in Leipzig a tempus clausum was observed), and cantatas for occasions not occurring in the period for which the cycle was planned (e.g. Christmas I and Epiphany VI).

The start of the cycle was exceptional: the publication opened with a libretto for St. John's Day, 24 June 1728, followed by a cantata text for Trinity V, which in 1728 fell on 27 June. Only from the second installment, with cantata texts for occasions from St. Michael's Day (29 September) to the end of the year a few settings by Bach are extant, the oldest of these a setting for Trinity XXI (17 October 1728). Bach's setting of the first cantata of the second installment was only premiered in 1729. In total, for the complete cycle of 70 cantata librettos, nine settings by Bach are known, and only six of these fully extant.

In Lent 1729 at the latest Bach and Picander were collaborating on the St Matthew Passion libretto, which for some movements derived from Picander's 1725 Erbauliche Gedanken publication. It is not known whether the St Matthew Passion was premiered in 1727 or 1729.

Further publications and republications
From 1727 Picander was publishing his Ernst-Schertzhaffte und Satyrische Gedichte, large collections of serious, jocular and satirical poetry. All of its volumes, most of these reprinted several times, and reworked editions, up to its fifth and last volume published in 1751, contained poetry set by Bach, both sacred and secular compositions.

The complete 1728–29 cantata cycle was republished in Volume III of the Ernst-Schertzhaffte und Satyrische Gedichte, pp. 79–188, but now starting with the cantata libretto for Advent I, and with 1729 as the year indicated for the cycle. The volume contained several texts set by Bach, including secular cantatas and the libretto for the St Mark Passion, BWV 247, which Bach had set in 1731. Volume III was reprinted in 1737. After the early 1730s there is only one extant Bach composition with a libretto that also appeared in one of Picander's poetry collections: the Peasant Cantata of 1742.

Cantatas
An ideal cycle including all cantatas for Advent and Lent, but without counting Passion music for Good Friday nor music for the installation of a new council, would have 73 cantatas. Picander's 1728–29 cycle has 70. The difference is accounted for thus:
 No separate cantata for Palm Sunday: for this feast day Picander proposes to use the same cantata text as for Advent I.
 No (separate) cantata for Reformation Day. In the cycle proposed for 1728–29 the feast of Reformation Day coincided with Trinity XXIII (31 October 1728), however without Picander making any reference to that feast day in the title of the cantata for that Sunday.
 No cantata for Trinity XXVII, which didn't occur in 1728.
For all other possible occasions from St. John's Day 24 June 1728 to Trinity IV 4 July 1729 Picander provided a specific cantata text, whether or not the occasion occurred in the intended period, and whether or not providing music for the occasion was customary in Leipzig. Apart from the text for the Annunciation cantata which was placed after the text for Judica Sunday as last libretto for the third section, the sequence of cantata texts as printed in 1728 follows the occurrence of occasions for this period, with the Christmas I and Epiphany VI cantatas inserted at appropriate points.

Known settings of the cycle's librettos by Bach (or his son Carl Philipp Emanuel) in the 1728–29 period:
  (for Trinity XXI): Ich habe meine Zuversicht, BWV 188
  (for Christmas): Ehre sei Gott in der Höhe, BWV 197a (incomplete)
  (for New Year): Gott, wie dein Name, so ist auch dein Ruhm, BWV 171. At least three movements are parodies.
  (for Epiphany III): Ich steh mit einem Fuß im Grabe, BWV 156
  (for Estomihi): Sehet, wir gehn hinauf gen Jerusalem, BWV 159
  (for Easter Monday): Ich bin ein Pilgrim auf der Welt, BWV Anh. 190.
  (for Easter Tuesday): Ich lebe, mein Herze, zu deinem Ergötzen, BWV 145. Contains a chorus by Telemann, TWV 1:1350.
  (for Whit Monday): Ich liebe den Höchsten von ganzem Gemüte, BWV 174.
  (for St. Michael's Day): Man singet mit Freuden vom Sieg, BWV 149. Composed a year after the date intended for the cantata text in Picanders first print. BWV 149/1a (formerly BWV Anh. 198), an instrumental sinfonia for an abandoned cantata, is seen as Bach's first attempt to set Picander's libretto for St. Michael's Day as included in the cycle.
  (for the 19th Sunday after Trinity): a draft of six bars, BWV 1137 (formerly ), is maybe all that is left of Bach's setting of the Gott, du Richter der Gedanken libretto Picander wrote for that occasion.

None of Bach's extant settings of the cycle's librettos are for occasions not occurring in the period intended for the cycle (24 June 1728 to 4 July 1729), nor are there any settings by Bach from the cycle's texts for cantatas falling in Leipzig's tempus clausum. For the period from St. John's Day 1728 to Trinity IV 1729 there also appear to be no settings by Bach of cantatas for the liturgical year on texts outside Picander's cycle. In the same period Bach collaborated with Picander on several other projects, such as the secular cantata O angenehme Melodei, BWV 210a (12 January 1729), the wedding cantata Der Herr ist freundlich dem, der auf ihn harret, BWV Anh. 211 (18 January 1729) and Klagt, Kinder, klagt es aller Welt, BWV 244a a cantata for a memorial service of Leopold, Prince of Anhalt-Köthen (performed a few months after the Prince's death on 24 March 1729). It remains however uncertain whether the St Matthew Passion, with some of its music overlapping with that commemorative cantata and composed on a libretto by Picander, was premiered or performed on Good Friday 15 April 1729.

Reception

...

Reconstructions and completions based on extant music by Bach include:
 (Judica): Böse Welt, schmäh immerhin, based on BWV 209 by Gustav Adolf Theill, published in 1983.

Known settings by other composers:
 (Pentecost): Raset und brauset ihr hefftigen Winde, set by Johann Friedrich Doles in 1740, when a student of Bach.
 (Epiphany): Diß ist der tag, den der Herr gemacht hat, RoemV 154, by Johann Theodor Roemhildt.

References

Sources

External links
 Speculations Regarding the Original Liturgical Occasions of the Individual BWV 253–438 Chorales § Picander–Jahrgang at 

Bach cantatas by period of composition
1720s in music
Lyrics